I Married... is an American reality television series that aired on VH1. The series aired sporadically for seven episodes between 2003 and 2005.

Overview
I Married... chronicles various celebrity marriages and the ups and downs fame created for the couples. Couples featured in the program include:

 Rapper MC Hammer and his wife Stephanie
 Singer Darius Rucker and his wife Beth
 Former Apprentice contestant Omarosa Manigault-Stallworth and her husband Aaron
 Singer Carnie Wilson and her husband Rob
 Singer Sebastian Bach and his wife/manager Maria
 Musician Uncle Kracker and his wife Melanie
 Singer Sammy Hagar and his wife Kari

External links
 

VH1 original programming
2000s American reality television series
2003 American television series debuts
2005 American television series endings
English-language television shows